Luís Cláudio Carvalho da Silva (born 27 March 1987), commonly known as Cláudio, is a Brazilian footballer who plays as a forward for STK Muangnont in Thailand.

Biography
Born in Jaguarari, Bahia, Cláudio started his career at Palmeiras. He signed his first professional contract with the club in August 2005, which last until in June 2009. He was loaned to Juventude in the second half of year 2007 for its 2007 Campeonato Brasileiro Série A. But after his false identity discovered, he was suspended. In June 2008, he added 1 more year to his contract with Palmeiras. He was loaned to Campeonato Brasileiro Série B club Marília for a year in September 2008. He played twice in the national league, on 17 October and on 28 October. He also played for the team at 2009 Campeonato Paulista.

In July 2009, Swedish team Hammarby signed him for remainder of the season. The team finished as the 16th and relegated from Allsvenskan.

In February 2010 he was released by Palmeiras. He was signed by Brasil de Pelotas in June 2010 for 2010 Campeonato Brasileiro Série C, but never played. He was released in September, after Brasil failed to qualify for the second round.

In February 2018 Cláudio signed a two-and-a-half year contract with First Professional League team Dunav Ruse.

At the end of June 2019, Cláudio joined Thai club Angthong.

International career
He played 3 times at 2005 FIFA U-17 World Championship. The team finished as the runner-up.

References

External links
  
  
 
 

1987 births
Living people
Brazilian footballers
Brazil youth international footballers
Brazilian expatriate footballers
Allsvenskan players
First Professional Football League (Bulgaria) players
Sociedade Esportiva Palmeiras players
Esporte Clube Juventude players
Marília Atlético Clube players
Hammarby Fotboll players
Grêmio Esportivo Brasil players
Salgueiro Atlético Clube players
São José Esporte Clube players
Associação Portuguesa de Desportos players
Clube Atlético Juventus players
Associação Atlética Caldense players
FC Dunav Ruse players
Luis Claudio Carvalho da Silva
Association football wingers
Expatriate footballers in Sweden
Brazilian expatriate sportspeople in Sweden
Expatriate footballers in Bulgaria
Brazilian expatriate sportspeople in Bulgaria
Expatriate footballers in Malta
Brazilian expatriate sportspeople in Malta
Expatriate footballers in Thailand
Brazilian expatriate sportspeople in Thailand
Sportspeople from Bahia